Circumstantial Productions is a multimedia production and book publishing company founded by Richard Connolly in Nyack, New York.

Notes and references

Publishing companies of the United States